The Cruel Embrace is a 1987 Belgian drama film directed by Marion Hänsel. The film was selected as the Belgian entry for the Best Foreign Language Film at the 60th Academy Awards, but was not accepted as a nominee.

Cast
 Marianne Basler as Nicole, la mere
 Thierry Frémont as Ludo adolescent
 Yves Cotton as Ludo enfant
 Marie-Ange Dutheil as Mademoisell Rakoff
 André Penvern as Micho
 Frédéric Saurel as Tatar
 Claudine Delvaux as Madame Blanchard
 Jacky Pratoussy as Monsieur Blanchard

See also
 List of submissions to the 60th Academy Awards for Best Foreign Language Film
 List of Belgian submissions for the Academy Award for Best Foreign Language Film

References

External links
 

1987 films
1987 drama films
Belgian drama films
1980s French-language films
Films directed by Marion Hänsel
Films scored by Frédéric Devreese